Zephyr is the sixth studio album by English electronic music duo Basement Jaxx. Released on 7 December 2009 as an extended play (EP) internationally.

Background
The group had originally planned on recording a double album, with one album consisting of more ambient and mellow songs and the other traditional dance music tracks. However, the group decided on releasing Scars on its own, with Zephyr as its follow-up.

Felix Buxton told PopMatters: "[As] we were very keen on kind of doing a double-album. And then it’s just one of those things: you feel [you’re in] your progressive rock phase. It's very Spinal Tap to do a double-album, and acts [sometimes] take themselves too seriously, so we were at that point [where] we want to take ourselves seriously; and also we also always enjoy doing the soundscape stuff."

Zephyr was released on 7 December 2009 by record label XL. Initially, the album was only released as a digital download, but a physical release followed in March 2010.

The track "Hip Hip Hooray" was created for the Tate Modern as part of a series of tracks commissioned to be played alongside paintings. The track was inspired by the painting by Karel Appel, and includes cello, piano and organ by Jack Nunn.

"Walking in the Clouds" features the voice of Joe Benjamin, a 70-year-old Bermudan man that walks around Brixton with "a Stetson hat, a large stick and a kind of poncho." Buxton befriended him when he used to live there, then he invited Benjamin to the studio to record "Benjilude", an interlude from their 2003 album Kish Kash.

Reception 

AllMusic called the album an "altogether more reflective affair [than Scars] that allows Buxton and Ratcliffe to showcase their unique interpretation of a chillout album", though criticising the album's short length.

Track listing

Charts

References 

XL Recordings albums
2009 albums
Basement Jaxx albums

pt:Scars (álbum de Basement Jaxx)